The basil-thyme case-bearer moth (Coleophora tricolor) is a moth of the family Coleophoridae found in Europe. It was first described by the 6th Baron Walsingham in 1899.

Description
The wingspan is 14–18 mm.

The larvae feed on grasses (Poaceae species), including Bromopsis erecta, cock's-foot (Dactylis glomerata), Yorkshire fog (Holcus lanatus), crested hair-grass (Koeleria macrantha), timothy (Phleum bertolonii) and common meadow-grass (Poa pratensis). Young larvae eat the receptacle out of a floret of basil thyme (Acinos arvensis) and use the calyce as its first case. Before the onset of winter the larvae change its foodplant to grasses. The larva then lives in an ochraceous, bivalved, tubular leaf case of about 9 mm, with a mouth angle of about 25°. Larvae can be found from September to June or July.

Distribution
It is found in Great Britain, southern France and Greece.

References

tricolor
Leaf miners
Moths described in 1899
Moths of Europe
Taxa named by Thomas de Grey, 6th Baron Walsingham